Kadino Selo may refer to:
 Kadino Selo (Pale), Bosnia and Herzegovina
 Kadino Selo, Prilep, North Macedonia